The Japanese Lighthouse, or Poluwat Lighthouse, is an abandoned lighthouse situated on  Alet Island in Poluwat, Chuuk in the Federated States of Micronesia. It was completed in 1940 by the Japanese and was in use until being attacked by U.S. forces in World War II. It was listed on the  National Register of Historic Places in 1983. The lighthouse is a good example of pre-World War II "marine architecture" built by the Japanese.

Design 
Attached to the tower is a two-story operations building. The entire complex is surrounded by a perimeter fence consisting of horizontal and vertical concrete posts.

History 
To assist with navigation by ships between Palau and Chuuk Lagoon, construction on a lighthouse was started in 1938 by the Empire of Japan. At the time, Chuuk and much of Micronesia was governed by the Japanese as part of its South Pacific Mandate. As the construction utilized forced labor from Poluwat and neighboring islands, as well as lacking heavy machinery, the lighthouse was not completed until 1940. It and the nearby airfield were discovered by American reconnaissance aircraft on April 10, 1944. Repeated airstrikes soon put both out of commission. The lighthouse was abandoned and never rebuilt, eventually becoming overgrown with tropical vegetation. It was listed on the National Register of Historic Places on August 16, 1983.

See also
 Japanese Lighthouse (Garapan, Saipan), similar lighthouse in the Northern Mariana Islands

References

Sources 

 

Chuuk State
Lighthouses completed in 1940
Transport buildings and structures in the Federated States of Micronesia
Lighthouses on the National Register of Historic Places
National Register of Historic Places in the Federated States of Micronesia
World War II sites in the Federated States of Micronesia
World War II on the National Register of Historic Places
1940 establishments in Oceania
1940 establishments in the Japanese colonial empire
Japan–Federated States of Micronesia relations